Ed Levine (born January 27, 1952) is the creator/founder of Serious Eats, the author of the entrepreneurial memoir Serious Eater: A Food Lover's Quest for Pizza and Redemption (Portfolio Penguin/Random House, 2019), and the host of the podcast Special Sauce. He was formerly a frequent The New York Times contributor. His stories on iconic American foods such as pizza, hot dogs, hamburgers, ice cream and cheesecake have appeared in many U.S. periodicals, including GQ, BusinessWeek and The New York Times. In 2016, Levine was inducted into the James Beard Foundation's Who's Who of Food & Beverage in America.

Education 

Levine grew up in Cedarhurst, New York, and graduated from Fairfax High School in Los Angeles in 1969. He attended Grinnell College in Iowa with a BA in music, and in 1985, earned his MBA from Columbia Business School.

Food criticism 

Levine's first book New York Eats was a guide to New York City's best non-restaurant food. Published in 1992, Levine's research stretched back to the 1970s. A follow-up, New York Eats (More), was published in 1997. In 2005, he commemorated pizza's centennial in America by consuming 1,000 slices of pizza for Pizza: A Slice of Heaven, which also includes cartoons, poems, and essays about pizza by writers and chefs, including Nora Ephron, Garry Trudeau, Calvin Trillin, Ruth Reichl, Mario Batali, and Roy Blount Jr. Levine also co-wrote, The Young Man and the Sea which was published in May 2007. It is a collection of more than 100 seafood recipes and fisherman stories from Chef David Pasternack of New York's Esca. 

In December 2006, he founded the food website Serious Eats, covering cultural trends within the food community, chef gossip, restaurant reviews and message dialogue among readers, involving blogs, video, social network, and community-created food content. In 2010 Serious Eats won two James Beard Awards, one for best food blog and the other for best web video. Columnists on Serious Eats included the James Beard Award-winning columnists J. Kenji Lopez-Alt (The Food Lab) and Stella Parks (Brave Tart). 
 
Serious Eats has been praised by PBS's MediaShift as “the next generation of food media.” In 1997, Gourmet editor Ruth Reichl called Levine “the curator of New York's far-flung food museum” and “a missionary of the delicious…on a crusade to see that the people who make food get the recognition they deserve.”

Television and radio 

As a television personality, Levine hosted the co-host and consulting producer for Reservations Required on the Ultra HD Channel. He also created, co-produced and co-hosted (along with Vogue magazine food critic Jeffrey Steingarten) New York Eats for the Metro Channel. As a former radio producer, Levine created and hosted Dish for WNYC, New York's NPR affiliate, which was twice nominated for James Beard Awards for Electronic Media. Guests on Dish included the late Nora Ephron, Calvin Trillin, Frances McDormand, and Joel Coen. 

He started the podcast Special Sauce With Ed Levine in 2015 in which he speaks to chefs, restaurateurs, actors and other cultural figures about their relationships to food. The first episode features a conversation with Phil Rosenthal, creator of the television sitcom Everybody Loves Raymond. Special Sauce is produced by PRX. Special Sauce has received multiple nominations for a James Beard Award.

Music 

Levine has also co-produced records for Dr. John and written about music for Rolling Stone and The New York Times. As an Associate Producer at the now defunct concert production firm Levine worked on concerts at Carnegie Hall and Lincoln Center headlined by artists including Ray Charles, Sonny Rollins, Wynton Marsalis, Tom Waits, B.B.King, and the Staples Singers. Levine also worked as a publicist at Warner Bros. Records on acts including the B-52s, Talking Heads, and Rickie Lee Jones. He received a gold record for his work on Rickie Lee Jones.

Selected writings 
 "Was Life Better When Bagels Were Smaller?" December 31, 2003
 "Lo, a New Age of Heroes" December 1, 2004
 "It's All in How the Dog Is Served" May 25, 2005
 "Soul for the Chicken Soup" February 22, 2006

Bibliography 
    New York Eats, 1992, St. Martin's Griffin
 New York Eats (More), 1997, St. Martin's Griffin
 Pizza: A Slice of Heaven, 2005, Universe Publishing
 The Young Man and the Sea, 2007, Artisan Publishing
 Serious Eater: A Food Lover's Perilous Quest for Pizza and Redemption, 2019, Portfolio/Penguin

References

External links 
 Serious Eats
 Ed Levine Eats
 New York Magazine on Ed Levine
 NPR interview with Ed Levine

1952 births
American food writers
American television journalists
Living people
The New York Times writers
Columbia Business School alumni
Grinnell College alumni
People from Cedarhurst, New York